Bigstick Lake is a shallow endorheic alkali lake in the south-west region of the Canadian province of Saskatchewan. The lake was named after the Big Stick Trail that ran between the town of Maple Creek and the South Saskatchewan River. The trail was notable for a large, solitary tree along its route. The lake and its drainage basin are in a semi-arid region known as Palliser's Triangle.

The western half of Bigstick Lake is in the RM of Big Stick No. 141, while the eastern half is in the RM of Piapot No. 110. There are no communities nor recreational facilities along the lake's shore. Access is from Highway 728. A Big Stick Lake post office operated near the lake at SE-27-14-26-W3 from 1911 to 1925.

Description 
Bigstick Lake is south-west of the Great Sandhills and north of the Cypress Hills.

Bigstick Lake and part of its watershed are within two Important Bird Areas (IBA) of Canada – Maple Creek Grasslands (SK 041) and Bigstick Lake Plain (SK 042) – that total  of protected bird habitat. In 1925, Bigstick Lake and nearby Crane Lake were designated as bird sanctuaries but were discontinued as such in 1948. In 1974, Ducks Unlimited Canada built a restriction dam at the western end of the lake. The dam created a marsh that covers an area of about 100 to 200 hectares.

Bigstick Lake Plain IBA 
The IBA is a large pill-shaped protected area that encompasses three large salt lakes, Bigstick, Crane, and Ingebrigt. Mason Lake is a reservoir that forms the western section of Ingebrigt Lake. Its water is less salty and the levels are more stable than that of Ingebrigt Lake. The Bigstick Lake Plain IBA stretches from the Trans-Canada Highway near Piapot in the south to Highway 21 just south of Fox Valley in the north.

Birds found at the site include the Franklin's gull, ferruginous hawk, piping plover, burrowing owl, Wilson's phalarope, eared grebe, black-crowned night heron, California gull, ring-billed gull, and the lark bunting. The area is also home to the pronghorn antelope.

Most of the land within the IBA is either community pasture or operated by the Prairie Farm Rehabilitation Administration (PFRA). Ducks Unlimited Canada operates at two sites in the IBA. One is the dam at Bigstick Lake and the other is north-west of Ingebrigt Lake.

See also 
List of lakes of Saskatchewan
List of protected areas of Saskatchewan

References 

Lakes of Saskatchewan
Endorheic lakes of Canada
Saline lakes of Canada
Important Bird Areas of Saskatchewan
Piapot No. 110, Saskatchewan
Big Stick No. 141, Saskatchewan